Žabjak is a former village in northeastern Slovenia in the Municipality of Radenci. It is now part of the village of Boračeva. It is part of the traditional region of Styria and is now included in the Mura Statistical Region.

Geography
Žabjak lies southwest of the village center of Boračeva on the edge of the Mura Basin. It is a scattered settlement below the neighboring village of Janžev Vrh.

Name
The name Žabjak is derived from the Slovene common noun žaba 'frog'. This is also the basis of similar Slovene toponyms such as Žabnica, Žabče, Žablje, and Žabja vas, referring to a damp place where frogs lived.

History
Žabjak ceased to exist as a separate settlement in 1949, when it was annexed by Boračeva.

References

External links
Žabjak at Geopedia

Populated places in the Municipality of Radenci
Former settlements in Slovenia